The  Constitution Protection Office  (Hungarian: "Alkotmányvédelmi Hivatal", "AH") is a Hungarian internal security intelligence agency, formerly known as Nemzetbiztonsági Hivatal (en. Office of National Security). Its primary responsibilities are: counterintelligence, anticorruption, economic security and related proactive measures. The AH also leads investigations against organized crime and deals with (mainly internal) threats against society (such as subversion). 

AH is active since 2010.

General Directors
Dr. Bárdos Szabolcs

External links
internet page of the AH

References

Hungarian intelligence agencies
National security institutions
Hungary